Sponsianus, also known in English as Sponsian, may have been a Roman usurper during the third century. His existence is implied by a series of coins bearing his name, ostensibly part of a hoard excavated in the eighteenth century. No corresponding figure named Sponsianus is mentioned in any ancient sources, and the coins are widely believed to be the work of modern forgers. A study of wear marks on the coins published in November 2022 concluded that the coins were authentic, supporting Sponsian's existence as a historical figure. However, the study's methodology and conclusions have been criticized by a number of scholars.

If there were a historical Sponsianus, he might have been active during the Crisis of the Third Century, most likely in the province of Dacia. He could have proclaimed himself emperor in the 260s, after Dacia was cut off from the rest of the Empire during the reign of Gallienus. Another possibility is that he was active earlier, during the reign of Philip the Arab or his son, Philip II.

Discussion
The sole evidence for the existence of Sponsianus is his name on a few double-aurei and a silver coin reportedly uncovered in a coin-hoard in Transylvania in 1713, and subsequently dispersed among several collections. One was kept in the Hunterian Museum at Glasgow University, which also held three other coins from the original hoard. Another entered the bequest of Baron Samuel von Brukenthal, a Habsburg governor of Transylvania. The hoard included other coins bearing the names of Philip the Arab and Gordian III, among others.

The traditional opinion of numismatists has been to regard the coins as non-authentic: In 1868, the French numismatist Henri Cohen dismissed them as "very poor quality modern forgeries". The problems with the aurei are twofold: firstly, the obverse of the coin is "barbaric and strange" according to the findings of the Roman Imperial Coinage (a British catalogue of Roman Imperial currency), and the reverse of the coin is a copy of a Republican denarius struck in 135 BC. The coins are also unusually heavy, appear to have been cast (instead of the more usual stamping process), and the inscriptions themselves do not follow the conventions of the time. However, according to the ancient numismatist Wayne Sayles, as the usurpers and emperors of the time were often ephemeral, the lack of further coins and the unusual qualities of those that are extant should not be seen as evidence that Sponsianus did not actually exist.

After further study in 2022, a group of scientists argued that scratch marks on one coin bearing Sponsianus' name and image, visible under an electron microscope, proved that it circulated in antiquity. Paul Pearson of University College London led the research and said that he was astonished by the confirmation that the coin had been used. Jesper Ericsson stated that a chemical analysis of the earth deposits found in the coin's recesses showed that the coins had been buried in soil for hundreds of years. On the basis of the above analysis, another coin bearing Sponsianus' name, in the Brukenthal Museum in Sibiu in Transylvania, has also been reclassified as genuine.

In the aftermath of Pearson's analysis, several researchers have criticized the study and its conclusions. In an article for the Times Literary Supplement, Mary Beard suggests that the unusual features of the Sponsianus coin are better explained by its being an eighteenth-century forgery. Richard Abdy, the curator of the collection of Roman coins at the British Museum, condemned the study, stating "they've gone full fantasy." In the Journal Antigone, Alfred Deahl also argues that the coins are forgeries: he cites the unusual weight of the Sponsianus coins, the poor lettering and use of the genitive instead of the usual nominative case, the highly irregular casting process used to produce them, the imitation of a republican reverse, and the oddness of the other coins purportedly found in the same hoard. These doubts are echoed by Aleksander Bursche and Kyrylo Myzgin, who add that the very early finding and low gold content may count against the coins' authenticity. Alice Sharpless from the American Numismatic Society summarized criticism of the Pearson study by writing "the evidence of wear and of surface deposits cannot be shown conclusively not to have occurred in the modern period... Unless further study can provide more certain answers, it seems that these coins should continue to be regarded as modern forgeries." 

Pearson's study has also attracted significant attention from Romanian numismatists and classicists. Emanuel Petac, President of the Romanian Numismatic Society, stated that the coin "has nothing to do with the Roman world." On the basis of the design, which he characterizes as rudimentary and bizarre, and the inscription, he concludes that the coin could not have been minted by an emperor. Petac notes that the legend irregularly excludes his praenomen and cognomen, or whose son or grandson he is. Another Romanian academic, Florian-Matei Popescu, highlighted the lack of written attestations of Sponsianus or his name—though the name Sponsianus is attested in the Roman world in inscriptions, these are very rare. Popescu argues that if the coins are real, which he deems unlikely, they date to the reign of Philip the Arab, who opened a mint in Dacia making low-value bronzes to pay the army.

The name Sponsianus
The name Sponsianus is an authentic, but exceedingly rare, Roman name, derived from the Latin word spondere, to solemnly promise.  Pearson notes only one instance, from a funerary inscription naming an obscure person called Nicodemus Sponsianus, dating from the early first century. This inscription was not published until 1726, several years after the supposed discovery of Sponsian's coins, and Pearson regards this as an argument for their authenticity: a forger would not have known of the name.  Two other instances appear in the Corpus Inscriptionum Latinarum, a catalogue of known Latin inscriptions, all dating from the same period, while a further two inscriptions give the abbreviated form Sposianus; all five inscriptions are from Rome.  One of the latter was published by Jan Gruter well before the first known appearance of the coins, and other examples are known besides these, so a forger might still have been aware of or guessed at the existence of such a name.

Theories
Scholars have proposed several possibilities for when and where Sponsianus would have been active. One explanation, based upon the other coins found with the aurei, would date Sponsian's activity to the 240s, during the rule of Gordian III (AD 238–244) or Philip the Arab (AD 244–249). Based upon the location of his aurei, some scholars posit that he may have staged a revolt in Pannonia. Ilkka Syvänne places the revolt early in Philip's reign, and identifies Sponsianus with the obscure Severus Hostilianus mentioned in later Byzantine histories (though he notes the evidence is circumstantial).

Another explanation is that he was a military commander who crowned himself as emperor when Dacia was cut off from the rest of the empire around 260. With an ongoing pandemic and civil war, and the empire being fragmented at the time, Sponsianus may have assumed supreme command to protect the military and civilian population of Dacia until order was restored. The Romans eventually evacuated Dacia between 271 and 275. According to Jesper Ericsson:

The Roman Empire in this period was highly unstable; many peripheral areas were left to fend for themselves. Dacia in particular was abandoned in the 270s by Aurelian after it was deemed too difficult to defend. Sponsianus may have found himself responsible for thousands of people, without support from the central regime of the empire, and surrounded by hostile tribes; in this context, Sponsianus taking the title of emperor has been characterized as an attempt to maintain order. He would have had access to a military force consisting of two legions there and their associated auxiliary personnel, totalling tens of thousands of soldiers. No other evidence has been found of Sponsianus' rule, and if he did exist, this would seem to indicate that Sponsianus was either uninterested or unsuccessful in expanding his territory.

See also
 Pacatian
 Ingenuus
 Regalianus

Notes

References

Further reading

3rd-century Roman usurpers
Romans from unknown gentes
Year of birth unknown
Place of birth unknown
People whose existence is disputed